Albert Büche (born 1911, date of death unknown) was a Swiss footballer who was a squad member for Switzerland in the 1934 FIFA World Cup. He also played for FC Nordstern Basel.

References

1911 births
Year of death missing
Swiss men's footballers
Switzerland international footballers
1934 FIFA World Cup players
Association football forwards
FC Nordstern Basel players